Minuscule 857 (in the Gregory-Aland numbering), Θε28 (von Soden), is a 12th-century Greek minuscule manuscript of the New Testament on paper. The manuscript has complex content.

Description 

The codex contains the text of the Gospel of Luke and Gospel of John on 391 paper leaves (size ). The text is written in one column per page, 28 lines per page.
It is ornamented.

Text 
The Greek text of the codex is a representative of the Byzantine text-type. Kurt Aland placed it in any Category V.

It was not examined by the Claremont Profile Method.

History 

F. H. A. Scrivener and C. R. Gregory dated the manuscript to the 12th century. Currently the manuscript is dated by the INTF to the 12th century.

The manuscript was added to the list of New Testament manuscripts by Scrivener (670e) and Gregory (857e). Gregory saw it in 1886.

Currently the manuscript is housed at the Vatican Library (Gr. 645), in Rome.

See also 

 List of New Testament minuscules
 Biblical manuscript
 Textual criticism
 Minuscule 856
 Minuscule 858

References

Further reading

External links 
 

Greek New Testament minuscules
12th-century biblical manuscripts
Manuscripts of the Vatican Library